Back to Back is the sixteenth studio album by English rock band Status Quo and released in November 1983.  For the first time in the group's history, it featured four singles, "Ol' Rag Blues" (highest position No. 9), "A Mess of Blues", originally a hit for Elvis Presley (No. 15), "Marguerita Time" (No. 3), and "Going Down Town Tonight" (which reached No. 20 in a different, re-recorded version to the album version.) The album entered the UK chart at its highest position of No. 9.

It was the last recorded before the group temporarily disbanded in 1985 and therefore the last to feature original bass guitarist Alan Lancaster and drummer Pete Kircher. Lancaster co-wrote the first single, "Ol' Rag Blues", with Keith Lamb, lead singer of British bands The Kase, Sleepy Talk and Mr. Toad, and founder and lead singer of Australia's successful glam rock band Hush. Lancaster was angered when the production company declined to release the version featuring his lead vocal (which has since been made available as a bonus track on the 2006 remastered reissue), in preference to that featuring the voice of Francis Rossi.  He also made no secret of his dislike of "Marguerita Time", which he thought was too pop-orientated for the group. When they appeared on BBC's Top of the Pops to mime to the single, his place was taken by Jim Lea of Slade, who were also on the programme that week. The Top of the Pops performance was also notable for Rick Parfitt falling into Pete Kircher's drum set near the end of the song while the song kept playing. On the DVD Hello Quo, Parfitt claims that he had planned this action, although many people thought he was drunk. On the same DVD, Alan Lancaster also said that he wasn't so concerned with "Marguerita Time" as he was with "Going Down Town Tonight", which – according to him – was not a Status Quo recording and featured no Status Quo musicians apart from Francis Rossi.

Track listing

The 2006 remaster has a snippet of Bernie Frost singing "I've Got Tears In My Ears From Lying On My Back In Bed Crying Over You" by Homer and Jethro at the beginning of "No Contract" and a slightly longer fade, extending the runtime by almost twenty seconds.

2006 reissue bonus tracks

September 2018 Deluxe Edition (CD2) bonus material

Personnel

Status Quo
Rick Parfitt – guitar, vocals
Francis Rossi – guitar, vocals
Alan Lancaster – bass, vocals
Andrew Bown – keyboards, backing vocals
Pete Kircher – drums, backing vocals

Additional personnel
Bernie Frost – backing vocals
Tim Summerhayes – engineering
Steve Churchyard – engineering

"Chris "Props" Ranson - Instrument Technician.

Chart positions

Certifications

References

1983 albums
Status Quo (band) albums
Vertigo Records albums
Albums recorded at AIR Studios